Ravne v Bohinju is a settlement in the Municipality of Bohinj in the Upper Carniola region of Slovenia. It includes the hamlets of Spodnji Konec, Zgornji Konec, and Dolino.

Geography
Ravne v Bohinju lies on a sloping mountain terrace above the railroad tunnel south of Bohinjska Bistrica. The village has a road connection to Bohinjska Bistrica, and the road continues west from the village into the foothills of the Komna Plateau. There are three springs in the village: one at the Pavle Clearing (Pavletov rovt) in Spodnji Konec, one at the Balant Commons (Balantova gmjana) in Zgornji Konec, and one at the Klemenc Commons (Klemenčeva gmajna) in Dolino.

Name
The name of the settlement was changed from Ravne to Ravne v Bohinju in 1955.

History
Cheese-making and dairy activity were formerly important economic activities in Ravne v Bohinju. Cheese-making was abandoned soon after the Second World War and the dairy industry went into decline.

Mass grave
Ravne v Bohinju is the site of a mass grave from the Second World War. The Jate Shaft Mass Grave is located in the woods southwest of the settlement, at a site where water collects and flows into a cave during heavy rain. The shaft contains the remains of two people thrown into the cave during the war.

References

External links

Ravne v Bohinju at Geopedia

Populated places in the Municipality of Bohinj